Lizette is a female given name that may refer to:

Lizette Alvarez (born 1964), American journalist
Lizette Cabrera (born 1997), Australian tennis player
Lizette Carrión (born 1972), American actress
Lizette Etsebeth (born 1963), South African discus thrower
Lizette Parker (1971–2016), American politician and social worker
Lizette Salas (born 1989), American professional golfer
Lizette Santana (born 1980), American singer-songwriter, record producer and actress known as Lizé
Lizette Thorne (1882–1970), English-born silent film actress
Lizette Woodworth Reese (1856–1935), American poet
Georgette Lizette Withers (1917–2011), British entertainer

See also
Lisette (disambiguation), alternative spelling of this name
Elizabeth (given name), related name
Liz, related name
Lizeth López (born 1990), Mexican female volleyball player
The Innocence of Lizette, 1916 American silent comedy-drama film

English-language feminine given names